The State Management of Affairs (Derzhavne upravlinnya spravamy, ДУС) is the Ukrainian government agency that is responsible for the management of public and social services which are determined by the president and parliament of Ukraine. The agency does this through the administration of several state owned companies and organisations. It is financed by the government. The president appoints the head of the agency based on the recommendations of his administration.

Companies, institutions and service organizations

 Hotel Ukrayina 
 Ukraine Air Enterprise
 Boryspil International Airport ("Hall of Official Delegations") 
 Harant - servis (catering)
 Derzhpostachannya (government post)
 Cossack Hall (restaurant)
 Ukrzhytloservis (Ukrainian housing service construction, dealer of Saeco products)
 Komunar (beauty salon, clothing alteration, medical et al.)
 Administrative Buildings Management (leasing company for office properties)
 Avtobaza DUS (motor pool)
 President-Hotel, Kyiv (closed joint stock company)

Sanatoriums and resorts

 Crimea
 Zori Ukrayiny resort and sanatorium (Yalta)
 Pivdenny sanatorium (Yalta)
 Chornomorsky sanatorium (Yalta)
 Hurzuf sanatorium (Hurzuf)
 Alushta sanatorium (Alushta)
 Artek international children's camp (Hurzuf)
 "Raduha" (Bakhchysarai Raion children's camp and home)
 Morshyn sanatorium (Morshyn, West Ukraine)
 Crystal Palace sanatorium (Truskavets, West Ukraine)
 Zbruch sanatorium (Husyatyn, West Ukraine)
 "Svitanok" children's camp (Kyiv)
 Koncha-Zaspa sanatorium and holiday home (Kyiv)
 "Pushcha-Vodytsia" recreation park (Kyiv)
 Kindergarten 73 and 182
 "Semashko" sanatorium and preventive health institute (Kislovodsk, Russia)
 "Ukraine" sanatorium (Yessentuki, Russia)
 "Psou" holiday home (Tsandryphsh, Georgia)

Cultural institutions
 Expocenter of Ukraine (national exposition centre)
 Ukrainian House (national centre of business and cultural cooperation)
 "Ukrayina" (national institute of the arts)
 Ukrainian cultural centre (Moscow)
 Mystetskyi Arsenal National Art and Culture Museum Complex

National parks and nature reserves
 Crimean (nature reserve) 
 Azov-Sivash (national park)
 "Bilo-ozerske" (forestry department)
 "Zalissya" (lodge)
 "Synyohora" (lodge)

Industry
 "Ukraine Press" (publishing)
 Construction
 "Ukrinvestbud" (investment)
 "Zhytomyr" (brewery)
 "Prioritety" (institute of science)

Medical institutions
 Research institute of preventive and clinical medicine. 
 "Feofaniya" hospital
 "Polyclinic 1"
 "Polyclinic 2"
 Institute of public health research
 Pharmaceutical department

References

External links

 Official website
 List of residents in the holiday houses "Koncha-Zaspa" and "Pushcha-Vodytsia"
 Video from TVi on how State Management of Affairs conducts its affairs (YouTube)
 Affairs from State Management of Affairs

Management
Organizations based in Kyiv
Presidency of Ukraine